Aleksandr Zhurik (born 29 May 1975) is a Belarusian ice hockey player. He competed in the men's tournaments at the 1998 Winter Olympics and the 2002 Winter Olympics.

Career statistics

Regular season and playoffs

International

References

1975 births
Living people
Olympic ice hockey players of Belarus
Ice hockey players at the 1998 Winter Olympics
Ice hockey players at the 2002 Winter Olympics
Ice hockey people from Minsk
Edmonton Oilers draft picks
Kingston Frontenacs players
Cape Breton Oilers players
Hamilton Bulldogs (AHL) players
Belarusian expatriate sportspeople in Canada
HC Dinamo Minsk players
Yunost Minsk players
HC CSKA Moscow players
HC MVD players
HC Khimik Voskresensk players
Belarusian ice hockey defencemen
Belarusian expatriate sportspeople in Russia
Belarusian ice hockey coaches
Belarusian expatriate ice hockey people
Expatriate ice hockey players in Russia
Expatriate ice hockey players in Canada